György Bárdy (26 May 1921 – 27 May 2013) was a Hungarian film and television actor.

Selected filmography
 Valahol Európában (1948)
 Nyugati övezet (1952)
 Two Confessions (1957)
 Pillar of Salt (1958)
 A Few Steps to the Frontier (1959)
 Az Életbe táncoltatott leány (1964)
 Kárpáthy Zoltán (1966)
 Jaguár (1967)
 Stars of Eger (1968)
 Hahó, Öcsi! (1971)

References

External links

1921 births
2013 deaths
Hungarian male film actors
Hungarian male television actors
Male actors from Budapest